Scotland Neck Historic District is a national historic district located at Scotland Neck, Halifax County, North Carolina. It encompasses 249 contributing buildings and 1 contributing object in the central business district and surrounding residential sections of the town of Scotland Neck. The district includes notable examples of Greek Revival and Gothic Revival style architecture. Located in the district is the separately listed Hoffman-Bowers-Josey-Riddick House.  Other notable buildings include the Fenner-Shields-Lamb House (1827); D. Edmondson Building (c. 1882), E. T. Whitehead drug store (c. 1901); Scotland Neck Bank (1914); Baptist Church (1917); Trinity Episcopal Church (1924); and town hall and fire station (1939), brick gymnasium and vocational building (1940), and one-story, elongated brick multiple housing unit (1943) built by the Works Progress Administration.  The latter building was utilized as a prisoner-of-war camp during World War II.

It was listed on the National Register of Historic Places in 2003.

References

Works Progress Administration in North Carolina
Historic districts on the National Register of Historic Places in North Carolina
Greek Revival architecture in North Carolina
Gothic Revival architecture in North Carolina
Buildings and structures in Halifax County, North Carolina
National Register of Historic Places in Halifax County, North Carolina